Amílcar Cabral International Airport , also known as Sal International Airport, is the main international airport of Cape Verde. The airport is named after the revolutionary leader Amílcar Cabral. It is located two km west-southwest from Espargos on Sal Island. Sal is the main hub for the national airline, Cabo Verde Airlines; and serves as a base for carrier Cabo Verde Express. This airport was also one of NASA's locations for a facility to handle the Space Shuttle after reentering from orbit.

History
The first airport on Sal Island was built in 1939 by Italy, as a fuel and provisions stopping-point on routes from Europe to South America. The first flight, an arrival from Rome and Seville, was on 15 December 1939. As a consequence of World War II, the Italian involvement in the airport project ceased. After World War II, the Portuguese colonial government purchased the airport from Italy and by 1949 the airport was a fully operational. In 1950, DC-4 service on Alitalia began on a Rome — Sal — Buenos Aires — Caracas route. In 1961 jet service (a DC-8) on the route rendered the stop at Sal unnecessary, and international service was suspended.

Between 1960 and 1967 Sal was a stop of the Voo da amizade (Friendship Flight), a dedicated service between Brazil and Portugal. It was operated from 1960 to 1965 by Panair do Brasil and from 1965 to 1967 by TAP-Transportes Aéreos Portugueses and Varig. Only Brazilian and Portuguese citizens or foreigners with permanent residence in Brazil or Portugal could purchase tickets for those flights, which were extremely popular due to their low fares. At this time, Cape Verde was a Portuguese Overseas Province and therefore part of the territory of Portugal.

From 1963 to 1975, the Portuguese Air Force's No 1 Transit Airfield (AT1, Aeródromo de Trânsito n.º 1) was installed in the Sal airport. The AT1 supported the military air connections between European Portugal and the Portuguese African provinces, as well as serving as the operational base for the maritime patrol aircraft occasionally deployed in Cape Verde.

Beginning in 1967, Sal was used as a refueling stop by South African Airways, for flights to and from Europe, since SAA was denied landing rights by most African countries due to the international boycott of apartheid. By 1983, SAA operated 13 round trips per week between Sal and Johannesburg, using the island as a stop for its Boeing 747 services to New York, Houston, London, Brussels and Amsterdam. The island saw as many as 36 SAA flights per week in the mid-1980s, but this number was cut dramatically following the imposition of US sanctions in 1987. By 1996 only one weekly SAA flight stopped at Sal (service between Johannesburg and New York). Sal was later used as a fuel stop on SAA's Atlanta service starting in 2003. SAA's final flight to Atlanta was on July 1, 2006.

Aeroflot used Sal as a stop on its Il-62 services from Moscow and Budapest to Dakar and Conakry in the late 1970s. Cubana also operated Il-62s on the Havana-Sal-Luanda-Maputo route in the early 1980s, and the Havana-Sal-Bissau-Luanda route in the late 1980s.

In 1985, TACV began service to Boston, Massachusetts using a McDonnell Douglas DC-10 provided by LAM Mozambique Airlines. Boston hosts the largest Cape Verdean community in the United States. TACV flights to Boston have since been shifted to Praia International Airport. Other international destinations include inter alia Amsterdam, Lisbon, Luxembourg, Madrid, Paris, and Porto. Domestic destinations include Santiago and São Vicente.

Until September 2005, it was the only airport in Cape Verde to serve international flights.

Since 2017 Sal has been a refuelling stop for the twice-weekly South Atlantic Air Bridge service operated by Air Tanker between the UK and the Falkland Islands. This is a temporary arrangement until the runway at Ascension Island is repaired which is expected to be in 2020.

Facilities and transport

Terminal

Amílcar Cabral has one terminal. It is a two-story building containing check-in, waiting, and arrival areas, as well as shopping, banking, and passenger services. The second floor houses airport operations and airline offices. There are four gates, and buses (Cobus 3000s) are used to transport passengers to the aircraft stands.

Cabo Verde Express has its head office in the Concourse Hall. The two duty-free shops along with refreshment facilities, retail kiosks and outdoor smoking areas are located after security scanning and passport control, adjacent to the six departure gates.

Runways
The airport's main runway is 3,272 m (10,734 ft) long and is the longest in Cape Verde. It is used for long-haul flights. It was also one of the designated emergency landing strips for the U.S. Space Shuttle. The second runway is 1,500 m (4,921 ft) long and was used by small planes. It is now closed for traffic.

Airlines and destinations
The following airlines operate regular scheduled and charter flights at Sal Amílcar Cabral Airport:

<small> Flights from Espargos to Marrakech operate as round trips that start and end at Paris Orly Airport.

Statistics

Access
The airport is located on the west side of the road (EN1-SL01) linking Espargos and Santa Maria, the island's main tourist destination. There is no scheduled public transport; taxicabs, shared cars known as "aluguer", and rental cars are available.

See also
List of buildings and structures in Cape Verde

References

External links

Airport information for GVAC at Fallingrain.com

Finelli, Marco (November 2004) "Sal: Island Gateway in the Atlantic Ocean", Airliner World, pp. 64–66.
TACV Timetable for Sal

Airports in Cape Verde
Espargos
Sal, Cape Verde
1940s establishments in Cape Verde
Space Shuttle Emergency Landing Sites